Jadoo Ka Charagh is the second album by Pakistani pop musical group, Awaz. The band became the major act after releasing Jadoo Ka Charagh (2nd studio album). The album was released in 1995 by Lips Records (Private) Limited. 
The album had many major hits such as Jadoo Ka Charagh, Shawa(Mein Na Manu Haar), Watan Kahani, Aajao etc.

Track listing
 Aaghaz
 Jadoo Ka Charagh
 Aurat
 Shawa
 Aajao
 Amun
 Dekha
 Mein Bhi Pakistani
 Aankhon Ki Baaatei
 Zinda Dil
 Watan Kahani

Personnel
All information is taken from the CD.

Awaz
Haroon Rashid – lead vocals
Asad Ahmed – lead guitars
Faakhir Mehmood – vocals, keyboards, piano

External links
Haroon Official Website - includes biography and complete discography of Awaz
Asad Ahmed Official Website
Faakhir Official Website

1995 albums
Awaz albums
Urdu-language albums